This article is about the demographic features of the population of Burkina Faso, including population density, ethnicity, education level, health of the populace, economic status, religious affiliations and other aspects of the population.

Burkina Faso's  million people belong to two major West African cultural groups—the Gur (Voltaic) and the Mandé. The Voltaic are far more numerous and include the Mossi, who make up about one-half of the population. The Mossi claim descent from warriors who migrated to present-day Burkina Faso and established an empire that lasted more than 800 years. Predominantly farmers, the Mossi are still bound by the traditions of the Mogho Naba, who hold court in Ouagadougou.

About 12,000 Europeans reside in Burkina Faso, the majority of whom are French.

Most of Burkina Faso's population is concentrated in the south and center of the country, with a population density sometimes exceeding . This population density, high for Africa, causes annual migrations of hundreds of thousands of Burkinabé to Ivory Coast and Ghana for seasonal agricultural work. About a third of Burkinabé adhere to traditional African religions. The introduction of Islam to Burkina Faso was initially resisted by the Mossi rulers. Christians, predominantly Roman Catholics, are largely concentrated among the urban elite.

Few Burkinabé have had formal education. Schooling is free but not compulsory, and only about 29% of Burkina's primary school-age children receive a basic education. The University of Ouagadougou, founded in 1974, was the country's first institution of higher education. The Polytechnic University of Bobo-Dioulasso in Bobo-Dioulasso was opened in 1995.

Population
According to the United Nations' Population Division, the population was 20,903,000 in 2020, compared to only 4,284,000 in 1950. The proportion of children below the age of 15 in 2020 was 44.4%, 53.2% of the population was between 15 and 65 years of age, while 2.4% was 65 years or older.

Population Estimates by Sex and Age Group (1.VII.2021):

Vital statistics
Registration of vital events is not complete in Burkina Faso. The website Our World in Data prepared the following estimates based on statistics from the Population Department of the United Nations.

Fertility and births
Total Fertility Rate (TFR) (Wanted Fertility Rate) and Crude Birth Rate (CBR):

Fertility data as of 2013 (DHS Program):

Other demographic statistics 

Demographic statistics according to the World Population Review in 2022.
One birth every 40 seconds	
One death every 3 minutes	
One net migrant every 21 minutes	
Net gain of one person every 52 seconds

The following demographic statistics are from the CIA World Factbook, unless otherwise indicated.

Demographic profile
Burkina Faso has a young age structure – the result of declining mortality combined with steady high fertility – and continues to experience rapid population growth, which is putting increasing pressure on the country's limited arable land. More than 65% of the population is under the age of 25, and the population is growing at 3% annually. Mortality rates, especially those of infants and children, have decreased because of improved health care, hygiene, and sanitation, but women continue to have an average of almost 6 children. Even if fertility were substantially reduced, today's large cohort entering their reproductive years would sustain high population growth for the foreseeable future. Only about a third of the population is literate and unemployment is widespread, dampening the economic prospects of Burkina Faso's large working-age population.

Population
21,935,389 (2022 est.)
21,382,659 (July 2021 est.)
Note: estimates for this country explicitly take into account the effects of excess mortality due to AIDS; this can result in lower life expectancy, higher infant mortality and death rates, lower population and growth rates, and changes in the distribution of population by age and sex than would otherwise be expected

Religions
Muslim 63.2%, Roman Catholic 24.6%, Protestant 6.9%, traditional/animist 4.2%, none 0.7%, unspecified 0.4% (2017-18 est.)

Age structure

0-14 years: 43.58% (male 4,606,350/female 4,473,951)
15-24 years: 20.33% (male 2,121,012/female 2,114,213)
25-54 years: 29.36% (male 2,850,621/female 3,265,926)
55-64 years: 3.57% (male 321,417/female 423,016)
65 years and over: 3.16% (male 284,838/female 374,057) (2020 est.)

0-14 years: 44.88% (male 4,519,960/female 4,503,937)
15-24 years: 20.07% (male 2,024,501/female 2,012,053)
25-54 years: 29.42% (male 2,999,941/female 2,915,264)
55-64 years: 3.2% (male 284,374/female 359,159)
65 years and over: 2.43% (male 181,996/female 306,324) (2017 est.)

Median age
Total: 17.9 years Country comparison to the world: 216th
Male: 17.0 years 
Female: 18.7 years (2020 est.)

Total: 17.3 years
Male: 17.1 years
Female: 17.4 years (2017 est.)

Population growth rate
2.53% (2022 est.) Country comparison to the world: 20th
2.58% (2020 est.) Country comparison to the world: 14th
3% (2017 est.)

Birth rate
33.57 births/1,000 population (2022 est.) Country comparison to the world: 19
34.34 births/1,000 population (2021 est.) Country comparison to the world: 20th

Death rate
7.71 deaths/1,000 population (2022 est.) Country comparison to the world: 103rd
7.92 deaths/1,000 population (2021 est.) Country comparison to the world: 89th

Net migration rate
-0.61 migrant(s)/1,000 population (2022 est.) Country comparison to the world: 127th
-0.62 migrant(s)/1,000 population (2021 est.) Country comparison to the world: 131st

Mother's mean age at first birth
19.4 years (2010 est.)
note: median age at first birth among women 25-29

Total fertility rate
4.27 children born/woman (2022 est.) Country comparison to the world: 22nd
4.39 children born/woman (2021 est.) Country comparison to the world: 18th

Contraceptive prevalence rate
30.1% (2020)
32.5% (2018/19)

Urbanization
urban population: 31.9% of total population (2022)
rate of urbanization: 4.75% annual rate of change (2020-25 est.)

Urban population: 30.6% of total population (2020)
Rate of urbanization: 4.99% annual rate of change (2015-20 est.)

Sex ratio
At birth: 1.03 male(s)/female
0-14 years: 1.03 male(s)/female
15-24 years: 1.00 male(s)/female
25-54 years: 0.87 male(s)/female
55-64 years: 0.76 male(s)/female
65 years and over: 0.76 male(s)/female
Total population: 0.96 male(s)/female (2020 est.)

Life expectancy at birth

total population: 63.44 years
male: 61.63 years
female: 65.31 years (2022 est.)

Total population: 63.06 years
Male: 61.28 years
Female: 64.89 years (2021 est.)

HIV/AIDS
Adult prevalence rate: 0.8% (2019 est.) County comparison to the world: 51st
People living with HIV/AIDS: 100,000 (2019 est.) Country comparison to the world: 44th
Deaths: 3,100 (2019 est.) Country comparison to the world: 33rd

Major infectious diseases
degree of risk: very high (2020)
food or waterborne diseases: bacterial and protozoal diarrhea, hepatitis A, and typhoid fever
vectorborne diseases: dengue fever and malaria
water contact diseases: schistosomiasis
animal contact diseases: rabies
respiratory diseases: meningococcal meningitis

note: on 21 March 2022, the US Centers for Disease Control and Prevention (CDC) issued a Travel Alert for polio in Africa; Burkina Faso is currently considered a high risk to travelers for polio; the CDC recommends that before any international travel, anyone unvaccinated, incompletely vaccinated, or with an unknown polio vaccination status should complete the routine polio vaccine series; before travel to any high-risk destination, CDC recommends that adults who previously completed the full, routine polio vaccine series receive a single, lifetime booster dose of polio vaccine

Nationality
Noun: Burkinabé (singular and plural)
Adjective: Burkinabé

Ethnic groups

Mossi 52%, Fulani 8.4%, Gurma 7%, Bobo 4.9%, Gurunsi 4.6%, Senufo 4.5%, Bissa 3.7%, Lobi 2.4%, Dagara 2.4%, Tuareg/Ikelan 1.9%, Dioula 0.8%, Unspecified/No answer 0.3%, Other 7.2% (including Europeans) (2010 est.)

Religions

Islam 61.5%, Roman Catholic 23.3%, Traditional/Animist 7.8%, Protestant 6.5%, Other/No Answer 0.2%, None 0.7% (2010 est.)

Languages

French(official), native African languages belonging to Sudanic family spoken by 90% of the population

Literacy
Definition: age 15 and over can read and write
Total population: 41.2%
Male: 50.1%
Female: 32.7% (2018 est.)

Education expenditure
5.4% of GDP (2018)

Slavery

In 2018, an estimated 82,000 people in the country were living under "modern slavery" according to the Global Slavery Index. News reports also indicate that "most child slaves on cocoa farms (Ivory Coast and Ghana) come from Mali and Burkina Faso, two of the poorest nations on Earth. The children, some as young as ten, are sent by their families or trafficked by agents with the promise of money. They are made to work long hours for little or no money."

References

Attribution:

External links
  Institut National de la Statistique et de la Démographie 

 
Society of Burkina Faso